Pinetta Colonna-Gamero (11 April 1905 – 27 September 1996) was an Italian painter. Her work was part of the painting event in the art competition at the 1936 Summer Olympics.

References

1905 births
1996 deaths
20th-century Italian painters
Italian women painters
Olympic competitors in art competitions
Painters from Turin
20th-century Italian women